Deputy Superintending Surveyor (DSS) is a Class I Engineering post in Survey of India, a National Survey Organization under Department of Science & Technology (India).
Recruitment to this post is made on the basis of competitive Indian Engineering Services Examination conducted by the Union Public Service Commission. A Deputy Superintending Surveyor joins the Survey of India Service (Civil and Electronics) in the Group-A entry Pay Band of PB-3 with a Basic Pay of Rs.15600-39100 and a Grade Pay of Rs.5400/- (Junior Time Scale) through the Engineering Services Examination.

Civil Services of India
Indian surveyors
Indian government officials